The Tu Es Petrus and St. George and the Dragon Stained Glass Windows are two nave window designs located in the former St. George Roman Catholic Church at 823 Climax Street in the Allentown neighborhood of Pittsburgh, Pennsylvania. The windows were made by Leo Thomas whilst working for George Boos Studio in the Munich Style design during the church’s construction in 1911-1912.

History 
The events that led to the creation of these stained glass windows dates back to King Ludwig I’s reign over Bavaria from 1786-1868. It was Ludwig’s desire to transform his capital city, Munich, into a hub for German art and culture. To accomplish his goals he subsidized large sectors of the arts, spending money on a multitude of artistic ventures. One of the projects Ludwig oversaw was the revival of mural and glass painting. Josef Gabriel Meyer took advantage of this funding, and in 1847 he created Meyer & Co., which specialized in making ecclesiastical furnishings. Meyer & Co. was very successful in Bavaria, and this led to Franz Xavier Zettler, Josef Meyer’s son-in-law, to found Meyer & Co.’s glass studio in 1860. He found his own studio in 1870, and worked primarily off commissions from the Catholic Church and the crown, until he expanded his sales to the United States in the late 19th century. The designer George Boos got his start in the industry working for Meyer & Co. whilst in Bavaria. In 1880 Boos founded his own art glass studio, George Boos Studio, where he was eventually joined by his English nephew, Leo Thomas. During his work with George Boos, Thomas designed and made the two stained glass windows in 1911-1912, that would go on to be installed in the former St. George Roman Catholic Church once its construction finished. The windows were nominated in January of 2016 to become a City Historic Landmark by Preservation Pittsburgh.

Architecture 
The two windows are examples of the Munich Style of art glass. The work of Leo Thomas is distinguished from others due to the process involved in creating the illusion of realism and depth on both sides of the glass. The work was incredibly labor-intensive and required skilled designers in order to fuse the paint to both sides. It is because of this difficult process, and the level of expertise needed to perfect the technique, that these pieces are incredibly rare. The designs of Thomas’s works also help him stand out from other creators. Through his travels in Europe, Thomas encountered numerous artworks that inspired his designs. He would incorporate elements of modern design, developments in German Secessionist art, and developments in Viennese Secessionist art into his works. The two stained glass windows in the former St. George’s Church included these design elements amongst others.

References